Alaba culliereti is a species of sea snail, a marine gastropod mollusk in the family Litiopidae.

Description

Distribution

References

External links

Litiopidae
Gastropods described in 1891